Alexey Olegovich Shebanov (born 1 June 1993) is a Russian professional association football player.

Club career
He made his Russian Football National League debut for FC Mordovia Saransk on 14 October 2010 in a game against FC SKA-Energiya Khabarovsk.

Personal life
His older brother Denis Shebanov is also a professional footballer.

External links
 
 

1993 births
People from Ulyanovsk Oblast
Living people
Russian footballers
Russia youth international footballers
Association football midfielders
FC Mordovia Saransk players
FC Saturn Ramenskoye players
BFC Daugavpils players
FC Dynamo Stavropol players
FC Khimik Dzerzhinsk players
FC Zenit-Izhevsk players
FC Dynamo Bryansk players
Russian expatriate footballers
Expatriate footballers in Latvia
Latvian Higher League players
Sportspeople from Ulyanovsk Oblast